Hayley Taylor-Young (born 25 February 2002) is an Australian soccer player. She plays for Canberra United in the W-League. She is a graduate of their pathway program and had a breakout season with the Canberra United Academy in 2019, after which she was signed by the senior team for the 2019–20 W-League season.

She made her debut, coming off the bench in Canberra's 3–2 win over Newcastle Jets FC in round 3 of the 2019–20 season, and scored her first goal in a 2–1 victory over Adelaide United in round 6.

Taylor-Young grew up in Canberra and began playing in the Canberra senior team while still at school.

References 

2002 births
Living people
Canberra United FC players
A-League Women players
Australian women's soccer players
Women's association footballers not categorized by position